The men's high jump at the 2012 World Junior Championships in Athletics was held at the Estadi Olímpic Lluís Companys on 11 and 13 July.

Medalists

Records
, the existing world junior and championship records were as follows.

Results

Qualification
Qualification: Standard 2.19 m (Q) or at least best 12 qualified (q)

Final

Participation
According to an unofficial count, 32 athletes from 27 countries participated in the event.

References

External links
WJC12 highjump schedule

High Jump
High jump at the World Athletics U20 Championships